The 1925 King's Birthday Honours in New Zealand, celebrating the official birthday of King George V, were appointments made by the King on the recommendation of the New Zealand government to various orders and honours to reward and highlight good works by New Zealanders. They were announced on 3 June 1925.

The recipients of honours are displayed here as they were styled before their new honour.

Knight Bachelor
 The Honourable John Henry Hosking  – lately judge of the Supreme Court.

Order of Saint Michael and Saint George

Companion (CMG)
 Albert Cecil Day  – official secretary to the governor-general.

Order of the British Empire

Knight Commander (KBE)
Civil division
 Major-General George Spafford Richardson  – administrator of Western Samoa.

References

Birthday Honours
1925 awards
1925 in New Zealand
New Zealand awards